74th meridian may refer to:

74th meridian east, a line of longitude east of the Greenwich Meridian
74th meridian west, a line of longitude west of the Greenwich Meridian